This is a list of minister from Conrad Sangma cabinet starting from 6 March 2018. Conrad Sangma, the leader of NPP was sworn in as the Chief Minister of Meghalaya on 6 March 2018.

NPP allied with BJP, UDP, PDF, HSPDP and others and it was the first time that NPP formed the government in Meghalaya.

Here is the list of the ministers of his ministry.

Council of Ministers

Former Ministers

See also 

 Government of Meghalaya
 Meghalaya Legislative Assembly

References

Lists of current Indian state and territorial ministries
Bharatiya Janata Party
National People's Party (India)
2018 in Indian politics

United Democratic Party (Meghalaya)
Meghalaya ministries
Hill State People's Democratic Party
2018 establishments in Meghalaya
Cabinets established in 2018